The Forbes River is a river in the Canterbury region of New Zealand. It arises in the Two Thumb Range and flows east into the Havelock River which joins the Rangitira River, which flows into the Pacific Ocean. The river was named by Julius von Haast after James David Forbes, Professor of Natural Philosophy at the University of Edinburgh in the mid 19th century.

See also
List of rivers of New Zealand

References

Land Information New Zealand - Search for Place Names

Rivers of Canterbury, New Zealand
Rivers of New Zealand